Robert John Hickman (26 December 1942 – 2 October 2019) was an Australian rules footballer who played with Richmond in the Victorian Football League.

In 1965 he moved to Tasmania to play for Latrobe Football Club. He was awarded the Wander Medal for the league's best and fairest player in 1966 and 1967. Hickman died in Latrobe in 2019, aged 76.

Notes

External links 		
		
		
				
		
2019 deaths		
1942 births		
Australian rules footballers from Victoria (Australia)		
Richmond Football Club players
Latrobe Football Club players